Natalia Valeryevna Anoikina ; born 13 February 1987), née Natalia Anoikina, is a Russian basketball center. She was part of the Russian team that won the 2011 European Championships. At the club level her teams placed second at the 2009–10 EuroCup and 2014–15 EuroLeague.

Myasoyedova was born in a family of medical doctors and took up basketball only around the age of 17. She is married to the volleyball player Sergey Anoikin.

References

1987 births
Living people
Russian women's basketball players
Centers (basketball)